The Annales Compostellani (Anales compostelanos) or Anales castellanos terceros are a set of Latin annals found in, and named after, Santiago de Compostela. They were found in the manuscript known as the Tumbo negro (or colorado) de Santiago de Compostela (also Codex Compostellanus or Códice compostelano), but they were originally redacted in the Rioja. They are grouped with the Chronicon Ambrosianum and the Chronicon Burgense as the Efemérides riojanas. They cover the history of the County and Kingdom of Castile and the Kingdom of Navarre until the reconquest of Seville in 1248.

Editions
In Enrique Flórez, ed. España Sagrada, XXIII (Madrid: 1767), 317–24. 
In José María Fernández Catón, ed. El llamado "Tumbo Colorado" (León: 1990), 251–58.

References
Conerly, Porter (1993). "Cronicones," pp. 468–9. Dictionary of the Literature of the Iberian Peninsula, vol. 1. Germán Bleiberg, Maureen Ihrie, and Janet Pérez, edd. (Greenwood Publishing Group). 
Martínez Díez, Gonzalo (2005). El condado de Castilla, 711–1038: La historia frente a la leyenda. Marcial Pons Historia. 
Iberian chronicles
13th-century history books
13th-century Latin books